Chloral cyanohydrin is the cyanohydrin derivative of chloral (trichloroacetaldehyde). It was historically used as a source of hydrogen cyanide for medicinal purposes. Chloral cyanohydrin is toxic by inhalation.

See also
Chloral hydrate

References

Blood agents
Cyanohydrins
Trichloromethyl compounds